Lebyazhyevsky District is an administrative and municipal district (raion), one of the twenty-four in Kurgan Oblast, Russia. It is located in the east of the oblast. Its administrative center is the urban locality (an urban-type settlement) of Lebyazhye. Population:  21,178 (2002 Census);  The population of Lebyazhye accounts for 39.0% of the district's total population.

References

Notes

Sources

Districts of Kurgan Oblast